Witness: Passing the Torch of Holocaust Memory to New Generations is a large format volume, published by Canadian Second Story Press, inspired by a 2014 United Nations exhibit of reflections and images of Holocaust survivors and students who have traveled on the March of the Living since 1988.  The exhibit and the book are intended to educate a new generation of students about the atrocities of the Second World War. In collaboration with March of the Living, an organization that spearheads visits to the Polish grounds where Nazi atrocities occurred, Toronto religious leader and Holocaust educator Eli Rubenstein compiled this book which includes an introduction from Pope Francis.

Witness features a unique interactive feature where the survivors, World War II liberators, and Righteous Among the Nations included in the book, have an invisible link embedded in their image. When their image is accessed with a smart phone or other device, the reader is taken to an excerpt of their video testimony on USC Shoah Foundation Institute for Visual History and Education (created by Steven Spielberg) or March of the Living Digital Archive Project websites. Translations in several other languages have been completed and/or published with the launch of the Polish language edition taking place in November 2018 at the Polin Museum, the Spanish edition (Testimonios; traspasar la antorcha de la memoria del holocausto a las nuevas generaciones) launched in January 2019, and the Hebrew edition scheduled for release in early to mid 2019. The exhibit was on display at the Auschwitz-Birkenau State Museum until July 2016. (View March of the Living Exhibit at Auschwitz-Birkenau State Museum.)

Survivor quotes 

"When you have hatred in your heart, there is no room for love."
Faigie Libman

"Hate will destroy the person doing the hating."
Nate Leipciger

"I am a strong believer that we must tell the stories to the youngsters – they are going to be our witnesses. But please present them in a way, with the kind of emotions, that will not create the same hatred that was done to us."
Max Glauben

"I tell my story for the purpose of improving humanity, drop by drop by drop. Like a drop of water falls on a stone and erodes it, so, hopefully, by telling my story over and over again, I will achieve the purpose of making the world a better place to live in."
Pinchas Gutter (quoted by US President, Barack Obama)

After learning there were people today denying the Holocaust …. "I said there and then, I would crawl on my
hands and knees all the way to Auschwitz-Birkenau, or anywhere else, to tell my story to anyone who was willing
to listen. This is why I march and why I still speak."
David Shentow

"To be a survivor after the Holocaust, is to have all the reason in the world to destroy and not to destroy. To have all the reasons in the world to hate and not to hate… to have all the reasons in the world to mistrust and not to mistrust..."
Elie Wiesel

"I never had a chance to say good-bye to my mother. We didn't know we had to say good-bye. …And I am an old woman today and I never made peace with the fact that I never had that last hug and kiss…. 
They say, 'When you listen to a witness, you become a witness.' I am only asking you to work for a world where nobody will have to live with memories like mine ever again. Please heal the world........"
Judy Weissenberg Cohen

Reception 

"This truly engrossing book, filled with both harrowing and uplifting photos, as well as moving statements by those who went on the march, brings this experience to life for the readers. To browse through this volume is to realize how much our people have endured through the centuries and how resilient we are in reaffirming life in the aftermath of that most tragic of calamities, the Holocaust. The statements made by the participants are so eloquent as to defy easy description. Witness provides a capsule history of the Holocaust that is especially useful for someone who is unaware of what actually happened..…What is perhaps most fascinating about this work is that despite its subject, the message is overwhelmingly positive….This is the true message of the book, to find hope and strength to make the world a better place. Witness is a beautiful and inspiring coffee table book in the most positive of ways. You want it there and will want to give it to others to remind them about the potential for all human beings to be caring and loving." Professor William Helmreich, Jerusalem Post

"...an auspicious book replete with touching stories, photographs and thoughts from some high-profile Holocaust activist like Elie Wiesel, the who's who of international Survivors and reflections from the young people, of many faiths and backgrounds, 'who have heard their stories and vowed to never let the world forget them'." Avrum Rosensweig, Founder, The Canadian Jewish Humanitarian & Relief Committee

"The book itself is a treasure trove of photographs, poetry, commentary and history designed to enlighten a broad audience about the events of the Holocaust." Paul Lungen, Canadian Jewish News

"Witness: Passing the Torch of Holocaust Memory to New Generations is a remarkable volume that testifies to the power of remembrance, commemoration, and education." Irene Tomaszewski, Cosmopolitan Review

"The many photographs (both archival and contemporary) are compelling: individual faces help make the ungraspable numbers personal. ... VERDICT Recommended for most libraries." Patricia D. Lothrop, St. George's School, Newport, RI 

"Witness is a moving project, one which serves as both a memorial to those lost and a charge to not let such events repeat themselves. Poems and testimonials explore topics ranging from the nature of evil to forgiveness, resulting in tremendous emotional pull. This is an important and worthwhile collection, laden with moral imperatives that none should evade." Michelle Anne Schingler, Foreword Reviews

"Through this book and other memorials, it is hoped that the youth of this world will continue to fight against injustice and pursue the cause of peace. Place a stone on this book as a monument memory that must be preserved.

As you observe the images and the texts from over a quarter century of the March of the Living, I ask each one of you to decide how you are going to change the world, how you are going to honor the legacy of the survivors.  Take a moment to pause and reflect and make a silent pledge to yourself to do your part in the fight for justice and equality." Aron Row, San Francisco Book Review

"Witness is a great starting point for intermediate- level inquiry-based learning and a superb addition to school libraries." Stephanie Reisler, EFTO Voice

"Witness is a courageous, eloquent and hopeful book. As the survivors near the horizon of their lives, they can rest assured that the torch of Holocaust memory has been successfully passed to a new generation, whose sincerity, idealism and commitment fill the pages of this uplifting and inspirational work." Irwin Cotler, National Post

"...an ambitious attempt to summarize the Holocaust and link it to both the March of the Living and the March of Remembrance and Hope. It succeeds. It draws on survivor testimony, young people's writings, and ample archival and contemporary photography to transform the reader into a witness of genocide….. It explores anti-Semitism and genocide, mass murders in the camps and by Einsatzgruppen, the reaction of the West, the death camps, resistance and profiles of resisters, survivor testimony of those participating in the commemorative marches, and  passing the torch to the next generations. The narrative is well-written and emotionally  provocative." Barbara Krasner, former member, Sydney Taylor Book Award Committee, New Jersey Association of Jewish Libraries Reviews

"The uniqueness of this book is in its presentation of issues through the prism of individuals, using direct quotes from those who have marched from Auschwitz to Birkenau. As such, we are viewers of the authentic and powerful emotions regarding the topic. We do not see it from the distant philosophical and historical point of view but rather up close, with riveting testimonies from people who were there. It is one of the most intense and fascinating documentations of those who survived the Holocaust and those who are dedicated to its memory. The majestic achievement of this book, March of the Living and, most importantly, the survivors is their hope and fight for compassion in a place of darkness described by Elie Wiesel as “the kingdom of night.” In a time of rising hate crimes and increasing anti-Semitism, this book offers a sense of serenity. It informs us of the choice survivors have made to march for love and life. Reading this book will help you find your own March of the Living and your own way to deal with the atrocities of the past, hoping for a better future." Matan Dansker, Jerusalem Post

"Looking through the book... it is difficult to avoid emotions. Fragments of memories of Holocaust survivors, their photos and appeals to the next generations, stories of selfless help and words about the loss of loved ones - all this moves and makes you reflect.  To move and make you reflect is also the goal of the March of the Living - an international program for education and memory, which this album presents.

It is striking that, despite such terrible experiences and the face to face contact with radical evil, many of them [the survivors] managed to keep faith in the possibility of victory for the good and perseverance in its proclamation. Max Glauben survived the Warsaw Ghetto and a number of concentration camps, including Majdanek. He came to the  March of the Living eight times to share his experiences.  “I am a strong believer that we must tell the stories to the youngsters – they are going to be our witnesses.”  "I am convinced that we must tell young people this story because they will be our witnesses," he said. 'But please present them in a way, with the kind of emotions, that will not create the same hatred that was done to us.."  The call for young people to become "witnesses of the witnesses" and warnings against hatred are also repeated by other survivors participating in the March. Nate Leipciger, who survived the ghetto in Sosnowiec and the Auschwitz camp, warns:  “You cannot have hate in your heart without being hateful against yourself." Dariusz Stola, Gazeta Wyborcza

Support 
The March of the Living Digital Archive, which hosts many of the videos linked in the book was made possible in part, through grants from the Citizenship & Immigration Canada - Multiculturalism Section, and the Claims Conference. The Digital Archives Project aims to gather Holocaust testimony from Canadian survivors who, since 1988, have traveled to Poland on the March of the Living to share their Holocaust stories with their young students in the locations they transpired.

2020 Edition 

To commemorate the 75th anniversary of the end of World War II and the liberation of Europe from Nazi Germany, a special “Liberation 75” edition of Witness was issued by Second Story Press.

The 2020 edition was supplemented with new liberation stories told by Holocaust survivors in both print and linked videos, along with additional content honouring those who rescued Jews during WWII.

The Preface to the 2020 edition includes new content regarding the March of the Living from Pope Francis and Pope John Paul II. 

The Afterword was written by Steven Spielberg, the founder of the USC Shoah Foundation, based on the address he delivered via video message for the 2020 March of the Living Virtual Ceremony.  (The actual March of the Living in Poland was cancelled because of COVID-19.) The cover of the book quotes Steven Spielberg speech, assuring the survivors that “..your stories are safe with us."

The cover of the new book features noted Holocaust survivor Edward Mosberg, who has attended several March of the Living programs, as the keynote speaker,  as well as participated in the USC Shoah Foundation 360 testimony initiative featuring Holocaust survivor testimony on site, in the actual locations in Europe where their tragic stories unfolded.

References

Personal accounts of the Holocaust
2015 non-fiction books